Oh My Ladylord is a 2021 South Korean television drama starring Lee Min-ki  and Nana. Directed by Oh Da-young, the series tells a story of romance between a man who 'does not' love and a woman who 'can't' love. It aired on terrestrial television channel MBC from March 24 to May 13, 2021, on Wednesdays and Thursdays at 21.30 (KST) for 16 episodes. It is available on iQIYI as "Oh! Master" with subtitles in multiple languages globally.

Oh My Ladylord's average rating of 1.6% is the second lowest ever recorded for a Korean drama airing on a prime time slot on a free-to-air television network, with KBS2 drama Love All Play setting the new record low of 1.4% a year later in 2022. The first half of the twelfth episode of Oh My Ladylord drew a 0.9% rating, tying with the penultimate episode of Love All Play to become the second-lowest single-episode rating ever (KBS2 drama Welcome saw a lower figure of 0.8% in 2020). Additionally, Oh My Ladylord was the first full-length prime time drama on free TV to never have rated above 3%. Media observers have cited Oh My Ladylord as an example of the downfall of MBC, which used to be regarded as the "Drama Kingdom" in the 1990s.

Synopsis 
In one corner we have a drama screenwriter and in the other, a rom-com actress.  While the writer chooses not to date, the actress cannot seem to date. The story unfolds as they find themselves sharing the same living quarters.

Oh Joo In (Nana), is a top rom-com actress who is a favorite with all audiences, young and old, male and female. In real life, however, it’s not that she chooses not to date but that she can’t date. Although she appears to live a flashy life on the outside, she is a down-to-earth woman with her own secret depths.

Han Bi Soo (Lee Min-ki), a man with a prickly side who shows a different side of himself when he’s in love. He has a scar that no one else knows, so he stimulates maternal instinct that makes it unable for anyone to look away from him.

Cast

Main
 Lee Min-ki as Han Bi-soo
  A thriller drama screenwriter who can't date. Had a traumatic event at the age of 18 that affects him to this day.
 Nana as Oh Joo-in
 A popular rom-com actress who is not good with her own romantic relationships. Her one and only goal all along is to provide for her family and to return to the home she grew up in.
 Kang Min-hyuk as Yu Jin
 Close friend of Joo-in since high school. Has been a successful artist abroad and returned to Korea in order to confess his love to Joo-in.

Supporting

 Lee Hwi-hyang as Kang Hae-jin, Han Bi-soo's mother
 Sunwoo Jae-duk as Han Min-joon, Han Bi-soo's father
 Kim Ho-jung as Yoon Jung-hwa, Oh Joo-in's mother
 Bae Hae-sun as Jung Sang-eun
 Lee Jung-gil
 Woo Hee-jin as Kim Yi-na
 Park Joo-hee as Oh Hee-jung
 Kim Chang-wan as Kim Chang-gyu, owner of Just Records
 Cha Min-ji as Choi In-young 
 Jang Eui-su as Park Geon-ho

Special appearances 
 Kim Woo-jin as staff
 Ahn Sol-bin as Kim Ji-yeon

Production
In 2021, Oh Da-young replaced Hyeon Sol-ip as director, after the latter was fired from the production. Oh Da-young's past credits as assistant director include Let's Eat 2, Woman with a Suitcase, The Guardians, Bad Papa, and The Golden Garden.

Viewership

 In this table,  represent the lowest ratings and  represent the highest ratings.
 N/A denotes that the rating is not known.
  Did not air on April 7 due to election broadcasts and therefore aired two episodes in a row on April 8.

References

External links
  
 Oh My Ladylord at Daum 
 
 
 Oh My Ladylord on IQIYI

MBC TV television dramas
Korean-language television shows
2021 South Korean television series debuts
2021 South Korean television series endings
South Korean romantic comedy television series